The Polish Physical Society (PTF) is a professional scientific society of Polish physicists.

History
The Polish Physical Society was established during an organizational meeting on 11 April 1920 in Warsaw. Władysław Natanson was appointed the first president of the society. In 1932, the society's reports were reorganized into science journal Acta Physica Polonica. In 1949, the first issue of Postępy Fizyki magazine was published. Since 1951, the Polish Physical Society has been organizing physics olympiads across Poland. In 1970, the first issue of Reports on Mathematical Physics was published in Toruń.

In 2005, the first direct elections of the society's governing body were held using electronic voting. In 2006, PTF has become a public benefit organization. The society has 1977 ordinary members as well as 18 supporting members. It consists of 19 regional centres located in Bydgoszcz, Białystok, Częstochowa, Gdańsk, Gliwice, Katowice, Kielce, Kraków, Lublin, Łódź, Opole, Poznań, Rzeszów, Słupsk, Szczecin, Toruń, Wrocław, Warszawa and Zielona Góra.

In 2008, the society established a department which deals with supporting women physicists, debunking stereotypes and encouraging girls to take up STEM subjects with particular emphasis on physics.

Awards of the Polish Physical Society
PTS awards the following prizes:

Marian Smoluchowski Medal
Smoluchowski-Warburg Prize
Wojciech Rubinowicz Prize
Arkadiusz Piekara Prize for best MSc thesis
Krzysztof Ernst Prize for popularizing physics
PTF Award for best physics teachers
PTF Special Award

Presidents of the Polish Physical Society
Leszek Sirko (2018-)
Katarzyna Chałasińska-Macukow (2014-2017)
Wiesław Kamiński (2010-2013)
Reinhard Kulessa (2006-2009)
Maciej Kolwas (2002-2005)
Ireneusz Strzałkowski (1997-2001)
Henryk Szymczak (1993-1997)
Stefan Pokorski (1991-1993)
Janusz Zakrzewski (1987-1991)
Tadeusz Skaliński (1981-1987)
Zdzisław Wilhelmi (1974-1981)
Wojciech Rubinowicz (1961-1974)
Aleksander Jabłoński (1957-1961)
Leopold Infeld (1955-1957)
Andrzej Sołtan (1952-1955)
Wojciech Rubinowicz (1949-1952)
Stefan Pieńkowski (1947-1949)
Stefan Pieńkowski (1938)
Czesław Białobrzeski (1934-1938)
Mieczysław Wolfke (1930-1934)
Stefan Pieńkowski (1923-1930)
Władysław Natanson (1920-1923)

Honorary members of the Polish Physical Society
Marie Curie
Władysław Natanson
Frédéric Joliot-Curie
Stefan Pieńkowski
Wojciech Rubinowicz
Alfred Kastler
Aleksander Jabłoński
Stanisław Mrozowski
Zdzisław Wilhelmi
Marian Mięsowicz
Andrzej Kajetan Wróblewski
Henryk Szymczak
Franciszek Kaczmarek

See also
European Physical Society
Polish Chemical Society
Polish Mathematical Society

References

Scientific organisations based in Poland
Scientific organizations established in 1920
1920 establishments in Poland